Higher Pentreath and Lower Pentreath (representing penn an treth, meaning head (of) the beach) are hamlets to the west of Praa Sands, within the parish of Breage. They are south of the A394 between Penzance and Helston in Cornwall, United Kingdom.

Pentreath Beach is a cove and beach on the Lizard Peninsula. The beach is popular with surfers as it is one of the few beaches in the area with regularly surfable waves (it is unsuitable for novice surfers because of submerged rocks and strong undercurrents).

References

Beaches of Cornwall
Hamlets in Cornwall
Lizard Peninsula